Bledsoe Building is a historic commercial building located at Asheville, Buncombe County, North Carolina. It was built in 1927, and is a two-story,  trapezoid-shape brick structure. It consists of three distinct sections; a central portion and flanking east and west wings. The building many retail services, offices, and residential rentals rooms.

It was listed on the National Register of Historic Places in 2003. It is located in the West Asheville End of Car Line Historic District.

References

External links

Commercial buildings on the National Register of Historic Places in North Carolina
Commercial buildings completed in 1927
Buildings and structures in Asheville, North Carolina
National Register of Historic Places in Buncombe County, North Carolina
Historic district contributing properties in North Carolina